Jacob Cohen or Ya'akov Cohen may refer to:

Jack Cohen (businessman) (1898–1979), supermarket founder born Jacob Kohen
Jacob Cohen (footballer) (born 1956), former Israeli international association football player
Jacob Cohen (scientist), scientist at NASA Ames Research Centre
Jacob Cohen (statistician) (1923–98), U.S. statistician and psychologist
Jacob I. Cohen Jr. (1789–1869), Baltimore banker and Jewish-rights activist
Jacob Raphael Cohen (1738–1811), Jewish minister in England, Canada, and the United States
Jacob Willem "Wim" Cohen (1923–2000), Dutch mathematician
Jake Cohen (born 1990), professional basketball player with Maccabi Tel Aviv
Ya'akov Cohen (born 1953), Israeli rabbi and politician
Ya'akov Cohen (writer) (1881–1960), Israeli poet, playwright, and writer
Rodney Dangerfield (1921–2004), U.S. comedian born Jacob Cohen